João Paulo Candeias Brito (born 5 June 1974) is a Portuguese retired professional footballer who played as a right winger.

Career
Born in Olhão, Algarve, Brito began his professional career with hometown's S.C. Olhanense. He moved in 1996 to neighbours Louletano DC, as both clubs competed in the third division.

Brito experienced his best period in his country while at C.F. Os Belenenses: although not an undisputed starter he was an important attacking unit, appearing in more than 100 matches in the league alone (the Lisbon team spent the 1998–99 season in the second level). After four years he moved to another side in the capital, C.F. Estrela da Amadora, going scoreless in 20 matches as they finished fourth and narrowly missed out on promotion from division two.

In the following years, Brito all but played abroad, beginning in Bulgaria with PFC CSKA Sofia for which he appeared regularly, also acquiring Bulgarian citizenship. He also represented lowly Kastoria F.C. in Greece – after a few months at Vitória Setúbal without one single league appearance – and SSV Jahn Regensburg in Germany, before retiring as a professional in 2007 at the age of 33.

Honours
Vitória Setúbal
Taça de Portugal: 2004–05

References

External links

1974 births
Living people
People from Olhão
Portuguese footballers
Association football wingers
Primeira Liga players
Liga Portugal 2 players
Segunda Divisão players
GD Beira-Mar players
S.C. Olhanense players
Louletano D.C. players
C.F. Os Belenenses players
C.F. Estrela da Amadora players
Vitória F.C. players
First Professional Football League (Bulgaria) players
PFC CSKA Sofia players
Football League (Greece) players
Kastoria F.C. players
SSV Jahn Regensburg players
Portuguese expatriate footballers
Expatriate footballers in Bulgaria
Expatriate footballers in Greece
Expatriate footballers in Germany
Portuguese expatriate sportspeople in Bulgaria
Portuguese expatriate sportspeople in Greece
Portuguese expatriate sportspeople in Germany
Sportspeople from Faro District